Otan Ayegbaju (Otan for short) is an historic town in Yorubaland founded about 500 years ago by descendants of Oduduwa, who migrated from Ifẹ. It is the headquarters of Boluwaduro Local Government Area. Nearby towns are Eripa, Iresi, Igbajo, Oke-run and Oyan.
 It's the seat of the Catholic Maria pilgrimage (Oke Maria).

The Owa of Otan Ayegbaju is the title given to the king. The Owa of Otan Ayegbaju was the 26th child of Oduduwa. The town's government wasn't destroyed by inter-tribal wars. The current Owa is Oba Lukman Adesola Ojo Fadipe Arenibiowo II, Owa Olatanka III. He was installed in June 2009.

Geography 
Otan is located in the northern area of Osun State, thirty-seven kilometers from Oshogbo. Its terrain consists of hills, mountains, dense forest, vegetation and gullies. The climate is tropical with warm temperatures and low humidity.

Otan Ayegbaju borders with Eripa, Iresi, Oke-run, Igbajo and Oyan.

References

Populated places in Osun State